The 1968–69 Midland Football Combination season was the 32nd in the history of Midland Football Combination, a football competition in England.

Also, it was the first season under this name after Worcestershire Combination was renamed to reflect its actual catchment area.

Division One

Division One featured 14 clubs which competed in the Worcestershire Combination Division One last season, along with four new clubs:
Bridgnorth Town
Lydbrook Athletic
Warwickshire Constabulary
Whitmore Old Boys, promoted from Division Two

League table

References

1968–69
M